By Absence of the Sun is the fourth studio album by Belgian rock band Triggerfinger, released on 18 April 2014. The album was recorded at the Sunset Sound Studios in Los Angeles and mixed at the RedStar Studios in Los Angeles.

Track listing

Personnel
Ruben Block - lead vocals, guitar.
Paul Van Bruystegem - bass guitar, backing vocals.
Mario Goossens - drums, backing vocals.

Charts

Weekly charts

Year-end charts

Certifications

References

External links
Band's official website.

2014 albums
Triggerfinger albums